John Paul Kennedy (fl. 1966 – 2015) is a retired Third Judicial District court judge in Salt Lake County, Utah. He was appointed to the bench in 2004 and retired as of January 1, 2015, to begin private practice as a mediator/arbitrator.

Early years and education 

John Paul Kennedy was born and raised in Minneapolis, Minnesota. He resided there through completion of high school. In elementary school he lived for two years in the area of Boston, Massachusetts, and four years in Milwaukee, Wisconsin. He attended Harvard University graduating with honors in 1963. In his senior year, he married his wife whom he met while attending Harvard. Judge Kennedy was captain of the Harvard Freshman and Varsity fencing teams. He received his law degree from Stanford University in 1966, where he was a member of the Board of Editors of the Stanford Law Review.

Kennedy authored articles for the Stanford Law Review such as "Toward Expediting Labor Injuctions under § 10(l) of the Taft-Hartley Act" and "Res Ipsa Loquitur Requires Nursery School to Explain Pupil's Injuries: Res Ipsa Loquitur. Burden of Proof. Infants. Schools and School Districts".

Legal career 

During his 30+ years as a practicing attorney, Kennedy has been involved in some significant litigation. He practiced law in Chicago, Illinois, from 1966 until 1972. Upon arriving in Utah, Kennedy was a partner in various Salt Lake City law firms, including Boyden & Kennedy, Nielson & Senior, and Edwards, McCoy & Kennedy. During his career, his practice focused on labor law, employment relations, and Indian affairs. He served as attorney general or assistant attorney general for seven Indian tribal governments. He is a member of the American Bar Association, the Utah State Bar Association and the Salt Lake County Bar Association.  Following retirement from the bench, he re-entered private practice as a mediator/arbitrator under the name John Kennedy Mediation LLC.

Notable Cases as a Lawyer

Supreme Court of the United States 

 Digital Equipment Corporation, Petitioner v. Desktop Direct, Inc. (1994)

US District Courts 

 Sidney v. MacDonald (1982)
 Cleveland v. Andress (1978)
 Hopi Tribe v. Watt (1982)
 Utah v. United States DOI

US Courts of Appeals 

 McCurdy v. Steele (1974)
 Desktop Direct v. Digital Equip. Corp. (1993)
 Sekaquaptewa v. MacDonald (1978, 1980)
 Stout v. Te-Moak Tribe of W. Shoshone (2000)

Judicial career 

Judge Kennedy was certified by the Utah Judicial Council to stand for retention in 2008 after having satisfactorily pass his judicial performance evaluations by attorneys and jurors. Judge Kennedy was successfully retained in office by Utah voters. The litigation section of the Utah State Bar has published a "Bench Book" outlining the courtroom practices and preferences of Judge Kennedy.

Personal background 

In 2001, Judge Kennedy chose to take a sabbatical to serve a mission for the Church of Jesus Christ of Latter-day Saints in St. Petersburg, Russia. (He was the president of the church's mission in St. Petersburg.) He remained there until his return to Utah in September 2004. During this time abroad, he learned to speak some conversational Russian . He and his wife have 6 children.

References 

Living people
Utah state court judges
Harvard University alumni
Stanford Law School alumni
American leaders of the Church of Jesus Christ of Latter-day Saints
American Mormon missionaries in Russia
People from Salt Lake County, Utah
21st-century Mormon missionaries
Mission presidents (LDS Church)
Latter Day Saints from Minnesota
Latter Day Saints from Massachusetts
Latter Day Saints from Wisconsin
Latter Day Saints from California
Latter Day Saints from Illinois
Latter Day Saints from Utah
Year of birth missing (living people)